Monascus purpureus (syn. "red yeast") is a species of mold that is purplish-red in color. It is also known by the names ang-khak rice mold, corn silage mold, maize silage mold, and rice kernel discoloration.

Taxonomy and morphology
The sexual state of M. purpureus is a cleistothecium with a two-layered wall enclosing round, evanescent 8-spored asci, lifted above the substrate on a multihyphal stalk. Ascospores can be heat resistant. The asexual state forms chains of hyaline or brownish chlamydospore-like cells.

Physiology and metabolites
During growth, Monascus spp. break down starch substrate into several metabolites, including pigments produced as secondary metabolites. The structure of pigments depends on type of substrate and other specific factors during culture, such as pH, temperature, and moisture content.

However, discoveries of cholesterol-lowering statins produced by the mold has prompted research into its possible medical uses. It produces a number of statins. The naturally occurring lovastatins and analogs are called monacolins K, L, J, and also occur in their hydroxyl acid forms along with dehydroxymonacolin and compactin (mevastatin). The prescription drug lovastatin, identical to monacolin K, is the principal statin produced by M. purpureus. Only the open-ring (hydroxy acid) form is pharmacologically active, but it is not produced on a commercial scale.

The mycotoxin citrinin is carefully monitored when Monascus is used in fermented foods. Industrial use of soluble red pigments as food dyes was discontinued in the USA and Europe because of this risk.

Importance
Monascus purpureus has been used for >1000 years in oriental fermented foods, including red kōji-kin, red yeast rice or ank-kak, rice wine, kaoliang brandy, and as the coloring agent for Peking duck.

Commercial species
The related fungi M. ruber and M. pilosus are also used in industrial applications. Monascus ruber is also a common food spoilage organism; most strains produce a brown pigment.

See also

References 

Bibhu Prasad Panda, Saleem Javed, Mohd. Ali (2010) Optimization of fermentation parameters for higher lovastatin production in red mold rice through co-culture of Monascus purpureus and Monascus ruber. Food and Bioprocess Technology, Vol. 3, no.3, 373-378

External links 
Index Fungorum page (synonyms)
Index Fungorum page (general)
Monascus purpureus page
Website about medicinal use of Monascus purpureus

Eurotiales
Molds used in food production